These are the Kowloon West results of the 2016 Hong Kong Legislative Council election. The election was held on 4 September 2016 and all 6 seats in Kowloon West where consisted of Yau Tsim Mong District, Sham Shui Po District and Kowloon City District were contested, one extra than the previous election due to the increase of the population. Four of the five incumbents were returned to the legislature with radical democrat Wong Yuk-man lost to the newcomer Yau Wai-ching of radical localist group Youngspiration, who beat Wong by 424 votes. The extra seat was won by college lecturer Lau Siu-lai who advocated for "self-determination". All six winners were women.

Overall results
Before election:

Change in composition:

Candidates list

Opinion polling

See also
Legislative Council of Hong Kong
Hong Kong legislative elections
2016 Hong Kong legislative election

References

2016 Hong Kong legislative election